is a town located in Shūchi District, Shizuoka Prefecture, Japan. ,  the town had an estimated population of 18,306 in 6622 households, and a population density of 134 persons per km2.

Geography
Mori is located in an inland area in the hills of western Shizuoka Prefecture. The town has a temperate maritime climate with very hot, humid summers and mild, cool winters, pleasant air.

Neighboring municipalities
Shizuoka Prefecture
Hamamatsu
Fukuroi
Kakegawa
Iwata
Shimada

Demographics
Per Japanese census data, the population of Mori has been in slow decline over the past 30 years.

Climate
The city has a climate characterized by hot and humid summers, and relatively mild winters (Köppen climate classification Cfa).  The average annual temperature in Mori is 15.9 °C. The average annual rainfall is 2083 mm with September as the wettest month. The temperatures are highest on average in August, at around 26.9 °C, and lowest in January, at around 5.4 °C.

History
Mori has been known since the Kamakura period as the location of the Oguni Jinja, the ichinomiya of former Tōtōmi Province and a pilgrimage destination. In the Edo period it was largely tenryō territory under direct control of the Tokugawa shogunate.

With the establishment of the modern municipalities system in the early Meiji period in 1889, the area was reorganized into the town of Mori within Shūchi District, Shizuoka Prefecture. In 1955-56, the area of the town was expanded through annexation of five neighboring villages. Discussions to merge with neighboring Fukuroi were shelved after a referendum opposing the merger was held in 2009.

Economy
The economy of Mori is mixed with industrial enterprise and agricultural enterprise. The main industries include automobile-related factories by Toyoda Gosei Co Ltd., and Yamaha Motor Company.

Education
Mori has five public elementary schools and three public junior high school operated by the town government. The town has one public high school operated by the Shizuoka Prefectural Board of Education.

Transportation

Railway
Tenryū Hamanako Railroad Tenryū Hamanako Line
 -  -  -  -

Highway
  Shin-Tōmei Expressway

Local attractions
Oguni Jinja

Noted people from Mori
Fuyuko Matsui, Nihonga artist
Muramatsu Shofu, writer

References

External links
Mori official website (Japanese)

 
Towns in Shizuoka Prefecture